{{Infobox college softball team
|name = Syracuse Orange softball
|CurrentSeason = 
|logo = Syracuse Orange logo.svg
|logo_size = 100
| founded = 2000
|university = Syracuse University
|conference = Atlantic Coast Conference
|conference_short = ACC
|city = Syracuse
|stateabb = NY
|state = New York (state)
|coach =  Shannon Doepking
|tenure = 4th
|stadium = Skytop Softball Stadium
|capacity = 650
|nickname = Orange
|national_champion = 
|wcws = 
|super_regional = 
|ncaa_tourneys = 2010, 2011, 2012
|conference_tournament =
Big East2010, 2011

ACC
|conference_champion = 
}}

The Syracuse Orange softball''' team represents Syracuse University in NCAA Division I college softball.  The team participates in the Atlantic Coast Conference. The Orange are currently led by head coach Shannon Doepking. The team plays its home games at Skytop Softball Stadium located on the university's campus.

History

Coaching history

Championships

Conference Tournament Championships

Coaching staff

Awards and honors

Conference Awards and Honors
Sources:

Big East Player of the Year
Alexis Switenko, 2006

Big East Pitcher of the Year
Jenna Caira, 2011

Big East Freshman of the Year
Tanya Rose, 2002
Erin Downey, 2005
Tonye McCorkle, 2006
Jenna Caira, 2009

References

 
Atlantic Coast Conference softball